Jathedar may refer to:

Titles
 Jathedar, leader of a Jatha (a group, a community or a nation).
 Jathedar of Akal Takht, head of Akal Takht and the Sikh Nation of the world.